The Namib day gecko (Rhoptropus afer) is a species of lizard in the family Gekkonidae. The species is found in the deserts of Namibia and southern Angola. It is the type species of the genus Rhoptropus.

Description
The dorsal surface is a well-camouflaged, dappled greyish-brown with small, rounded scales. The throat and the undersides of the tail and the limbs are bright yellow, the tail being "flashed" at other geckos as a signal. This gecko has long legs and long digits, apart from the abbreviated inner toe. The tips of the digits are flared, and the underside of the central digit has five or six scansors (specialist structures that help a gecko's feet to adhere to almost any surface).

Distribution and habitat
R. afer is native to southwestern Africa, where its range includes southern Angola and northern Namibia. It is adapted to desert life and is found in a range of habitats both on the Atlantic coast and many kilometres inland.

Ecology
The Namib day gecko is a diurnal species and feeds mostly on ants and beetles. On hot but breezy days, it may cool itself by climbing onto an elevated perch and raising itself high off the hot rock surface, orientating itself in such a way as to minimize its exposure to the sun. Geckos have highly sensitive colour night-vision capabilities. Geckos in the genus Rhoptropus are diurnal; their ancestors were nocturnal, but they have secondarily returned to daytime activity. Compared to the other members of its genus, the Namib day gecko is a runner rather than a climber. However, in dim light, such as experienced on foggy days on this coast, its maximum speed is significantly lower.

References

Further reading
Boulenger GA (1885). Catalogue of the Lizards in the British Museum (Natural History). Second Edition, Volume I. Geckonidae .... London: Trustees of the British Museum (Natural History). (Taylor and Francis, printers). xii + 436 pp. + Plates I–XXXII. (Rhoptropus afer, p. 217).
Branch, Bill (2004). Field Guide to Snakes and other Reptiles of Southern Africa. Third Revised edition, Second impression. Sanibel Island, Florida: Ralph Curtis Books. 399 pp. . (Rhoptropus afer, p. 267 + Plate 92).
Gates BC (2008). "Day Geckos of the Namib Desert: Rhoptropus afer Peters, 1869 and Rhoptropus bradfieldi Hewitt, 1935". Gekko 5 (2): 2–5.
Hedman HD, Chuga SC, Eifler DA, Hanghome GPK, Eifler MA (2021). "Microhabitat use of two sympatric geckos, Turner's thick-toed gecko (Chondrodactylus turneri) and the common Namib Day Gecko (Rhoptropus afer)". Journal of Arid Environments 188: 104448.
Peters W (1869). "Eine Mittheilung über neue Gattungen und Arten von Eidechsen ". Monatsberichte der Königlich Preussischen Akademie der Wissenschaften zu Berlin 1869: 57–66 + plate. (Rhoptropus afer, new species, pp. 59–60 + plate, figures 2, 2a, 2b, 2c, 2d). (in German and Latin).

afer
Geckos of Africa
Reptiles of Angola
Reptiles of Namibia
Reptiles described in 1869
Taxa named by Wilhelm Peters